Matthew "Matt" Dearborn is an American television producer, writer and director.

Career
Dearborn has written over 100 produced episodes of television, including, Beverly Hills, 90210, Eerie, Indiana, Parker Lewis Can't Lose, The Secret World of Alex Mack, Sliders, Phil of the Future and Even Stevens which he created. In 2008, he and Tom Burkhard created the series Zeke and Luther for Disney XD. On a dare from a friend, Dearborn auditioned for a recurring part on the short-lived series TV 101. He got the part, and also ended up writing three episodes for the series.

For creating Even Stevens, Dearborn received three consecutive Emmy Award nominations for Outstanding Children's series. In 2001, Even Stevens won the BAFTA Award for Outstanding International Children's series.

He graduated from California State University, Sacramento in 1982 majoring in Communication Studies.

He was previously married to former Miss USA contestant and actress Kelli McCarty from July 7, 2000 until 2006 but divorce was finalized on March 9, 2009.

References

External links

American television directors
Television producers from California
American television writers
American male television writers
Living people
People from San Anselmo, California
Year of birth missing (living people)
Screenwriters from California